Sweetman is an Irish surname. Notable people with the name include:

 Aaron Pajich-Sweetman (1998–2016), Australian murder victim
 Bill Sweetman (born 1956), American military historian
 Brendan Sweetman (born 1962), Irish philosopher
 Caroline Sweetman (born 1983), Scottish cricketer
 Courtney Sweetman-Kirk (born 1990), English footballer
 Dan Sweetman (born 1985), Australian television presenter
 David Sweetman (1943–2002), British writer and broadcaster
 Edmund Sweetman (1912–1968), Irish Fine Gael politician
 Elinor Sweetman (c1861–1922), Irish poet and author
 Gerard Sweetman (1908–1970), Irish Fine Gael politician and lawyer
 Harvey Sweetman (1921–2015), New Zealand fighter pilot
 John Sweetman (United Irishman) (1752–1826), Irish brewer and United Irishman
 John Sweetman (1844–1936), Irish politician and former leader of Sinn Féin
 Joseph Sweetman Ames (1864–1943), American physicist, professor and provost at Johns Hopkins University
 Kenneth Sweetman (born 1954), American organist
 Mary Sweetman (1859–1930), Irish novelist
 Maude Sweetman (1877–1943), American politician who served in the Washington State House of Representatives
 Maurice Sweetman (d 1427), 14th-century Archdeacon of Armagh
 Milo Sweetman (died 1380), Irish archbishop
 Rebecca Sweetman, Professor of Ancient History and Archaeology, University of St Andrews
 Richard Sweetman (born 1990), Australian speedway racer
 Rod Sweetman (born 1953), Australian politician
 Roger Sweetman (1874–1954), Irish Fine Gael politician and lawyer
 Roger Sweetman (Newfoundland politician) (died 1862), Newfoundland politician
 Rory Sweetman (born 1956), New Zealand historian
 Tom Sweetman (1873–1945), Australian rules footballer

English-language surnames